Kevin Mayer (or , born 10 February 1992) is a French athlete. He is two-time world champion (2017, 2022), two-time Olympic silver medalist (2016 Rio de Janeiro and 2020 Tokyo) and world record holder in the decathlon. He is also a world and European champion in indoor heptathlon.

Career

2008–2011: Youth career
In 2009, at the age of 17, Mayer won the octathlon gold medal at the World Youth Championships. In the following year, he won  the decathlon gold medal at the 2010 World Junior Championships.

In 2011, at the European Athletics Junior Championships held in Tallinn, Mayer won the decathlon gold.

2012: First Olympic Games
Mayer competed at the 2012 Summer Olympics, finishing 15th.

2013–2015: European Championships medals
He won a silver medal in the heptathlon at the 2013 European Athletics Indoor Championships with a new personal best of 6297 points.
At the 2013 European Cup Combined Events he topped the podium and set personal bests in the 100 metres (11.04 sec), long jump (7.63 m), shot put (14.95 m) and the discus throw (44.89 m).

In 2014, at the European Athletics Championships held in Zurich, Mayer achieved a personal best of 8521 points in decathlon, winning him the silver medal.

On 12 August 2015, Mayer announced his withdrawal from the 2015 World Championships because of a hamstring injury sustained in the end of July 2015.

2016: Olympic silver medal
On 6 March 2016, Mayer announced his withdrawal from the 2016 World Indoor Championships because of a heel injury sustained during the hurdles race at the French Indoor Athletics Championships held at the end of February in Aubière.

At the 2016 Rio Olympics, Mayer earned a silver medal with a new personal best of 8834 points, finishing behind only two-time gold medallist Ashton Eaton, who was the world record holder at the time. Highlights of his campaign include equalling or improving personal outdoor bests in four events (100 m, shot put, 400 m, pole vault) and performing seasonal bests in three others (long jump, high jump, 1500 m); he was also the best decathlete in two disciplines (the shot put, with 15.76 m and 836 points; and the pole vault, with 5.40 m and 1035 points, sharing first place with Thomas van der Plaetsen) and lead the standings at the end of the first day of the competition (i.e. after 5 out of 10 events). Furthermore, this performance ranks as the sixth-best personal best score in the men's decathlon, and showed a marked improvement in form for Mayer, bettering his former personal best of 8521 points (set during the aforementioned silver medal run at the 2014 European Athletics Championships) by 313 points and the French national record by 260 points.

2017: European Indoor Champion and World Champion
Mayer's first combined events competition of the year was an indoor track and field triathlon (60m hurdles, shot put, long jump) at the National Indoor Meeting of Paris on 8 February. He finished last (out of three), with 1652 points after failing to receive a score in the 60m hurdles.

At the 2017 European Athletics Indoor Championships in Belgrade on 4–5 March, Mayer won the gold medal in the men's heptathlon. He set a new European record of 6479 points, beating the record set by Roman Šebrle in 2004 in Budapest by 41 points. It was also the second-best score in men's indoor heptathlon, behind Ashton Eaton's world record of 6645 points. He achieved two new indoor personal bests (in 60m hurdles and pole vault) and established a new European record. 

On 15 April, he had his first outdoor competition at a triathlon (200m, high jump, discus throw) in L'Étang-Salé, Réunion. Mayer won all three events, finishing in first place with 2642 points. Mayer then took part in the decathlon in his adopted hometown of Montpellier on 13–14 May, and achieved a season best mark in discus and shot put. He also took part in the French Elite Outdoor Championships in Marseille on 14–15 July, but struggled in the rainy and windy conditions and finished the competition with a few no marks.

At the 2017 World Championships in Athletics in London, Mayer completed his first decathlon of the year and won his first World Championships gold medal with a world-leading score of 8768 points, ahead of Germans Rico Freimuth (silver, 8564 points) and Kai Kazmirek (bronze, 8488 points). This was also France's first international gold medal in the decathlon. Despite not coming first in any specific discipline, Mayer achieved new personal bests in the 100 metres (10.70s, 929 points), 400 metres (48.28s, 897 points), and the 110 metres hurdles (13.75, 1007 points). A setback in the pole vault – where he cleared his only mark at 5.10m only at the third and last try – 30 cm below his personal record – prevented him from breaking his personal record.

2018: Indoor heptathlon gold and world decathlon record 
 
In 2018, at the World Indoor Championships held in Birmingham, Mayer won gold in the heptathlon with 6348 points. In a closely fought contest, Mayer narrowly beat Damian Warner of Canada by five points to win his first world indoor title. He achieved his indoor personal best in the 60m and long jump. However, at the European Championships, he failed in the long jump with three fouls and did not finish the decathlon.

After the setback at the European Championships, Mayer took part at the Décastar held in Talence, France in September 2018. There Mayer broke Ashton Eaton's decathlon world record, establishing a new mark of 9126 points. Mayer started strongly in the first day, but at 4563 points was still 140 points still behind Eaton's first day total. In the second day, he achieved his best-ever distance of 71.90m in the javelin and the best-ever height of 5.45m in the pole vault in a competition, as well as wins in the 110m hurdles and discus, allowing him to break the world record by 81 points.

2019–2020
Mayer did not defend his European heptathlon title at the 2019 Indoor Championships.

At the 2019 World Championships, Mayer suffered an injury and had to withdraw from the men's decathlon event. He achieved his personal best in 100m and shot put and was leading the competition after 7 events, but withdrew before the pole vault due to a problem with his Achilles.

2021: Tokyo Olympics silver
At the 2021 European Athletics Indoor Championships held in Toruń, Poland, Mayer won the Men's heptathlon event with 6392 points.

At the 2020 Tokyo Olympics, Mayer started below expectation in the Men's decathlon, ending in 5th place after the first five events.  However, in the final day, he performed well in a few events, such as the hurdle and pole vault as well as a personal best in javelin throw, which allowed him rise in the ranking and win a silver behind Damian Warner of Canada.

2022: World gold 

Mayer did not compete in the 2022 World Athletics Indoor Championships due to an issue with his Achilles after catching Covid earlier.

At the World Championships held in Eugene, Oregon in July, Mayer regained his world title in Men's decathlon, during which Warner withdrew due to a hamstring injury. He again started poorly in 6th place after the first day, but gradually improved his position, and won in the last day with first place finishes in pole vault and javelin.

2023: European gold 
Kevin Mayer is taking part in the 2023 European Athletics Indoor Championships held in Istanbul in March 2023. On the first day of competition, he equals his personal best in the 60m (6.85s), achieved 7.41m in the long jump, reached 15.81m in the shot put and cleared 1.98m in the high jump, ranking second in the general classification, 67 pts from the Norwegian Sander Skotheim. The second day, he won the 60-meter hurdles (7.76s), the pole vault (5.30 m) and managed to keep a lead of 30 points in the standings (6,348 pts against 6,318 pts) at the end of the 1,000 meters despite a slower time than his Norwegian opponent (2 min 37 s 82 against 2 min 44 s 20). He won a third European indoor heptathlon champion title after 2017 and 2021, equaling the performance of the Czech Roman Šebrle on the number of titles of this event.

Personal life
Mayer was born on 10 February 1992 in Argenteuil, a commune in the northwest suburbs of Paris, to André and Carole Mayer. His paternal family and German surname have their origin in the northeastern region of Lorraine, where his father grew up; some of his relatives still live in the Moselle department next to the border with Germany. He has three brothers: Thibault, Thomas and Sébastien; the family was raised in La Roche-de-Glun, a small town by the Rhône river in the southeast of the country (Drôme department), where his parents still live.

Mayer started practicing athletics at the sports association EA Tain-Tournon close to his hometown; after the club's merger with two other Drôme-based athletics associations in 2013, Mayer continued representing it through the new institution, EA Rhône Vercors 26-07. He trains at the CREPS Montpellier, a training center for high-performance athletes, since 2008; ever since moving to Montpellier, he has been coached by Bertrand Valcin. He studied for a :fr:Diplôme universitaire de technologie en mesures physiques (a technological degree in physical measurements, including metrology and instrumentation) at the University of Montpellier-Sète.

Achievements

Performance in major international events

Best results in combined events

List of senior decathlons with results over 8000 points

List of senior heptathlons with results over 5800 points

Personal bests

Outdoor

Indoor

Notes

References

External links

 
 
 
 Kevin Mayer at Decathlon 2000
 
 
 
 
 
 

1992 births
Living people
Athletes (track and field) at the 2012 Summer Olympics
Athletes (track and field) at the 2016 Summer Olympics
Olympic athletes of France
French decathletes
Sportspeople from Argenteuil
European Athletics Championships medalists
Olympic silver medalists for France
Olympic silver medalists in athletics (track and field)
Medalists at the 2016 Summer Olympics
World Athletics Championships athletes for France
World Athletics Championships medalists
Olympic decathletes
World Athletics record holders
European Athlete of the Year winners
World Athletics Championships winners
World Athletics Indoor Championships winners
European Athletics Indoor Championships winners
Athletes (track and field) at the 2020 Summer Olympics
Medalists at the 2020 Summer Olympics